Thanjavur District is one of the 38 districts of the state of Tamil Nadu, in southeastern India. Its headquarters is Thanjavur. The district is located in the delta of the Cauvery River and is mostly agrarian.  As of 2011, Thanjavur district had a population of 2,405,890 with a sex-ratio of 1,035 females for every 1,000 males.

Geography 

Demographics 

According to the 2011 census, Thanjavur district had a population of 2,405,890 with a sex-ratio of 1,035 females for every 1,000 males, much above the national average of 929. 35.39% of the population lived in urban areas. A total of 238,598 were under the age of six, constituting 121,949 males and 116,649 females. Scheduled Castes and Scheduled Tribes accounted for 18.91% and 0.15% of the population respectively. The average literacy of the district was 74.44%, compared to the national average of 72.99%. The district had a total of 605,363 households. There were a total of 974,079 workers, comprising 117,321 cultivators, 327,673 main agricultural labourers, 26,430 in house hold industries, 363,060 other workers, 139,595 marginal workers, 12,592 marginal cultivators, 87,688 marginal agricultural labourers, 4,770 marginal workers in household industries and 34,545 other marginal workers.

At the time of the 2011 census, 97.42% of the population spoke Tamil and 1.07% Saurashtra as their first language.

Politics  

|}

Economy

Agriculture 
Thanjavur district lies in the Kaveri delta, the most fertile region in the state. The district is the main rice producing region in the state and hence known as the Rice Bowl of Tamil Nadu. The Kaveri River and its tributaries irrigate the district. Apart from paddy, farmers here grow coconut and sugarcane and it is the largest producer of coconut in Tamil Nadu. Being an agrarian economy, industrial growth in the district is mainly confined to agro-based industries. Many rice mills and oil mills are spread over the district.

Tourism

Great Living Chola Temples of Thanjavur 

Thanjavur's Brihadisvara Temple (known also as Rajarajesvaram or Peruvudaiyār Kōvil), built by the Cholas and now a UNESCO World Heritage Site, is one of the largest of its kind and also one of the finest examples of classical Dravidian architecture in the world.
Airavateswara temple in Darasuram near Kumbakonam has also been designated part of the same UNESCO  World Heritage site and forms another major tourist attraction of the district.
The green paddy fields of the Kaveri river valley provide a  picturesque setting for these and other important ancient monuments of the district.

Manora Fort 
The fort was built by Maratha ruler Serfoji II in 1814–1815 to commemorate the successful advance of the British over Napoléon Bonaparte. The tower is surrounded by a wall and a moat, resembling a fort. The monument looks like a pagoda, with arched windows, circular staircase and eaves separating one storey from the other.

Flora 
The flora of Thanjavur was studied and documented in some detail by S. A. Ganapathy for a doctoral thesis in 1992.

Cultural significance 
Thanjavur is famous for the "Saraswathi veena" (the national instrument), Thanjavur art plates, Thanjavur oil paintings and Thalaiyatti Bommai.

Notable people 

 Rao Bahadur Sir A. T. Pannirselvam Udaiyar, Leader of justice party
 V. S. Srinivasa Sastri
 Srinivasa Ramanujan
 Sivaji Ganesan, actor and former Rajya Sabha Member
 K. Thulasiah Vandayar, former MP
 G K Moopanar TMC- Congress
G. K. Vasan Rajya Sabha Member
 S. S. Palanimanickam, former Central Minister
 S.D Somasundaram EX Minister and MP
 Parasuram EX MP – Loksabha
  L. Ganesan – EX MLA, MP, MLC
 R. VaithiyaLingam – Ex Minister and Rajya Sabha Member
 M Ramachandran MLA – DMk 
 Durai Govindarajan EX MLA 
 Durai Chandrasekaran MLA
 R. Doraikkannu Ex. Minister for Agricultural, Tamil Nadu

See also 

Achanoor
Adirampattinam
Ayyampettai
Chola Nadu
Kangeyampatti
Karaimeendarkottai
Keelakorukkai
Keeranur
Kelavannipet
Kodiyalam
Kollangarai Vallundanpattu
Kondavattanthidal
Kothangudithattimal
Kotrapatti
Kovanoor
Kullangarai
Kumbakonam
Kurungulam Melpathi
List of districts of Tamil Nadu
Madukkur
Orathanadu Taluk
Ottankadu
Palaiyanallur
Palayee Agraharam
Pallathur
Palliodiaivayal
Pandipalamavikadu
Pangal
Pannikondaviduthy
Paravathur
Pattukkottai
Perappadi
Peravurani
Perumbur IInd Sethi
Pillaiyarmatham
Pinnai Nallur
Ponkundu
Temples of Kumbakonam

Notes and references

External links 

 Thanjavur District

 
Districts of Tamil Nadu